The 2020–21 Azadegan League was the 30th season of the Azadegan League and 20th as the second highest division since its establishment in 1991. The season started in 2 November 2020 with 13 teams from the 2019–20 Azadegan League, two new teams relegated from the 2019–20 Persian Gulf Pro League: Pars Jonoubi Jam and Shahin Bushehr and three new teams promoted from the  2019–20 League 2: Chooka Talesh, Esteghlal Mollasani and Shahrdari Astara as champion, runner-up and third placed team respectively. Karoon Arvand Khorramshahr's 1st Division licence were taken back from Damash and then again sold to Kheybar Khorramabad. The league started on 22 November 2020 and ended on 19 July 2021. Fajr Sepasi Shiraz won the Azadegan League title for the first time in their history and was promoted to the Persian Gulf Pro League after an absence of eight years together with second-ranked Havadar Tehran.

Teams

Stadia and locations

Number of teams by region

League table

Results

Positions by round

Statistics

Top scorers 

source: topscorers at the end of league dsport.ir

See also
 2020–21 Persian Gulf Pro League
 2020–21 2nd Division
 2020–21 3rd Division
 2021 Hazfi Cup
 2020 Iranian Super Cup

References

Azadegan League seasons
Iran